The Saint-Cyr River  is a tributary of Doda Lake, flowing into the municipality of Eeyou Istchee Baie-James (municipality), in Jamésie, in the area of Nord-du-Québec, Quebec, Canada.

The Saint-Cyr river flows successively into the townships of Urban, Lacroix, Belmont and Royal. Forestry is the main economic activity of the sector; recreational tourism activities, second.

The Saint-Cyr River valley is served by the forest road R1053 (east-west direction) which passes on the north-west side and north of Lac Saint-Cyr. This road joins the road R1009 (North-South direction) which passes to the East of the Aigle River (Doda Lake).

The surface of the Saint-Cyr River is usually frozen from early November to mid-May, however, safe ice circulation is generally from mid-November to mid-April.

Geography

Toponymy

Notes et references

See also

Rivers of Nord-du-Québec
Jamésie
Nottaway River drainage basin